Confluence Outdoor (formerly known as Confluence Watersports) is an American manufacturer of kayaks, canoes, and related accessories. The company comprises eight separate brands which each specialize in paddling sport boats or accessories.

History 
American Capital financially sponsored the merger of Wilderness Systems and Mad River Canoe in 1998 to form Confluence Holdings Corporation, known as Confluence Watersports, which it then purchased in 2002.

In 2005, Confluence purchased Watermark, acquiring the Dagger, Harmony Gear, Adventure Technology, and Perception brands. The company then acquired Bomber Gear in 2010.

Sue Rechner joined the company as CEO in 2007, coming from Victorinox Swiss Army.

On April 22, 2014, J.H. Whitney & Company purchased Confluence Holdings Corporation from American Capital. They renamed it Confluence Outdoor and announced plans "to grow the business into a full-service outdoor recreation company."

On December 16, 2019, it was announced that Confluence had been acquired by Pelican International, a Canadian manufacturer of kayaks and other outdoor products.

Brands 
Confluence Outdoor manages eight separate brands which each specialize in paddling sport boats or accessories.

Adventure Technology 
Manufacturer of kayak paddles.

Boardworks Surf 
Distributor of imported stand up paddle boards, surf boards, and accessories.

Dagger Kayaks 

Manufacturer of recreational, touring, and whitewater kayaks - including the Alchemy, Axiom, Axis, Katana, Jitsu, Mamba, Mambo, Nomad, Torrent, and Zydeco models. Founded in 1988 based on the success of whitewater and touring kayaks designed by Joe Pulliam.

Harmony Gear 
Manufacturer of canoe and kayak accessories - including apparel, fishing accessories, life jackets, paddles, and sprayskirts.

Mad River Canoe 
Manufacturer of recreational, sporting, touring, and whitewater canoes - including the Adventure, Caption, Destiny, Expedition, Explorer, Freedom, Heritage, Journey, Legend, Malecite, Outrage, Reflection, Synergy, Serenade, models. Mad River Canoe was founded in 1971 by Jim Henry and Kay Henry in Vermont. The company's Malecite model was created in the Henry's woodshed, becoming their first model and remaining the company's signature model today.

Perception Kayaks 

Manufacturer of fishing, recreational, and touring kayaks - including the Carolina, Essence, Expression, Impulse, Prodigy, Tribe, Tribute, and Triumph models. Perception Kayaks was founded by Bill Masters in the early 1970s. The company develops rotational molding of plastic kayaks, reducing the expense and maintenance of kayaks.

Wave Sport Kayaks 

Manufacturer of recreational and whitewater kayaks - including the Diesel, Ethos, Fuse, Habitat, Mobius, Project, and Recon models. Founded in 1986 by Chan Zwanzig who started by importing the popular Lazer from the United Kingdom. The company began manufacturing the Lazer themselves by 1988 and began creating its own models in the 1990s. Wave Sport is a licensed brand now based out of the United Kingdom but is not actually manufactured by Confluence Outdoor.

Wilderness Systems 

Manufacturer of fishing, recreational, and touring kayaks - including the Aspire, Commander, Focus, Pamlico, Pungo, Ride, Tarpon, Tempest, Tsunami, and Zephyr models. Andy Zimmerman and John Sheppard founded Wilderness Systems in 1986 in North Carolina.

Operations 
The company operates in a single 300,000-square-foot facility in Greenville, South Carolina, which opened in 2011 and as of 2014 employs over 425 people.

References 

Kayak manufacturers
Sporting goods manufacturers of the United States